KEBR may refer to:

 KEBR (FM), a radio station (88.1 FM) licensed to serve Sacramento, California, United States
 KRPU, a radio station (1210 AM) licensed to serve Rocklin, California, which held the call sign KEBR from 1988 to 2015
 KQEI-FM, a radio station (89.3 FM) licensed to serve North Highlands, California, which held the call sign KEBR-FM from 1990 to 2003
 KZZO, a radio station (100.5 FM) licensed to serve Sacramento, California, which held the call sign KEBR until 1988